Pluton was a  74-gun French ship of the line built at Toulon. She was one of two prototypes for a derivative sub-class of the original design; this sub-class (slightly smaller than the primary design) was specially intended for construction in some of the shipyards in states occupied by the French, where there was less depth of water than in the main French shipyards. Although the Pluton (and her sister, the Borée) were built at Toulon, all other vessels of this sub-class were built in these overseas yards, notably at Antwerp but also at Genoa, Trieste, Venice, Amsterdam, Flushing and Rotterdam.

The Pluton took part in the Battle of Trafalgar under Captain Julien Cosmao-Kerjulien, and escaped to Cádiz with other ships. Rayo and San Francisco de Asis were wrecked on their journey back.

She was captured by Spain in Cadiz on 14 June 1808 and commissioned in the Spanish Navy as Pluton. She was renamed Montañes on 20 April 1810, and was eventually broken up in 1816.

See also
 List of ships of the line of France

References

 Winfield, Rif & Roberts, Stephen S. French Warships in the Age of Sail 1786–1861: Design, Construction, Careers and Fates. Seaforth Publishing, 2015. .

Ships of the line of the French Navy
Ships built in France
Téméraire-class ships of the line
1805 ships